Man in the Chair is a 2007 independent film written and directed by Michael Schroeder. The film stars Christopher Plummer, Michael Angarano, M. Emmet Walsh, and Robert Wagner.

Premise
The drama stars Christopher Plummer as Flash, a man who longs for the days when he worked as a crew member on such cinematic masterpieces as Citizen Kane. When Flash meets teenage film fanatic Cameron Kincaid (played by Michael Angarano), he becomes an unlikely mentor and agrees to help Cameron make a film to compete in a student competition where the top prize is a film school scholarship and, for Cameron, a ticket out of his difficult home life. Flash, who sees his own life drawing to a close recruits the support of his eccentric friends at the Motion Picture home and helps Cameron make his film and chase his dream.

Cast
 Christopher Plummer as Flash Madden
 Michael Angarano as Cameron Kincaid
 M. Emmet Walsh as Mickey Hopkins
 Robert Wagner as Taylor Moss

External links
 Man in the Chair - Official Movie Website
 

2007 films
2007 drama films
American drama films
Films about filmmaking
Films about old age
American independent films
2007 independent films
2000s English-language films
Films directed by Michael Schroeder
2000s American films